Coals of Fire is a 1915 American silent short drama film directed by Tom Ricketts. The film was written by Theodosia Harris, and stars Harry von Meter and Louise Lester.

Cast
 Harry von Meter - John Vincent
 Louise Lester - Mrs. John Vincent
 Jack Richardson - Mad John
 Vivian Rich - Mary Vincent Love, the Daughter 
 Herbert Lathrop - Ben Vincent, the Son 
 Arthur Millett - Henry Love, Mary's Husband 
 Fred Smith - The Foreman

References

External links

1915 films
1915 drama films
Silent American drama films
American silent short films
American black-and-white films
1915 short films
American Film Company films
Films directed by Tom Ricketts
1910s American films